Dyo Potamoi (Greek: Δυο Ποταμοί or Δύο Ποταμοί, literally 'Two Rivers',  or  İki Dere) is an abandoned hamlet in Cyprus, east of Kapouti. De facto, it is under the control of Northern Cyprus.

Dyo Potamoi has been abandoned since 1964. In 1960, it had 40 inhabitants, all of them Turkish Cypriots.

References

Communities in Nicosia District
Populated places in Güzelyurt District
Former populated places in Cyprus